Kalkash or Kalkesh may refer to:
 Kalkesh, East Azerbaijan
 Kalkash, Kermanshah
 Kalkash, Zanjan